The Catastrophe of the Balloon "Le Pax" was a 1902 short silent film directed by Georges Méliès. It was released by Méliès's Star Film Company and is numbered 398 in its catalogues.

The film is a recreation of a real-life catastrophe that occurred in Paris on 12 May 1902. At 5 a.m. on that day, the Brazilian inventor Augusto Severo de Albuquerque Maranhão and his mechanic, M. Georges Saché, set off in Severo's dirigible, the Pax. They intended to fly from Paris to Issy-les-Moulineaux. However, while the aeronauts were still over Paris at about 400 meters' altitude, the motor stopped and the dirigible exploded. Both Severo and Saché were killed.

The Catastrophe of the Balloon "Le Pax" is the second-to-last of Méliès's "reconstructed newsreels" (staged re-enactments of current events), made between The Eruption of Mount Pelee and The Coronation of Edward VII. It is currently presumed lost.

See also
List of lost films

References

External links

1902 films
Documentary films about historical events
1900s short documentary films
Black-and-white documentary films
Films directed by Georges Méliès
Lost French films
French silent short films
French black-and-white films
French short documentary films
1900s lost films
1900s French films